This is a list of films which placed number one at the box office in Australia during 2013. All amounts are in Australian dollars.

Notes
A  Iron Man 3 opened on 24 April across Australia, the day before the box office for the week was totaled (which was 25 April that week; as most films open on Thursdays, the Australian box office week "begins" on that date). It managed to debut at #2 from tickets sold in just one day, and nearly topped the box office—The Croods earned $3.5 million, while Iron Man 3 grossed $3.4 million.
B  Madman Entertainment's Reel Anime festival of 2013 peaked inside the top 20 in its second week of release, the week ending 9 October (at #20). It ran for a week in select New Zealand cities, then in Australia from 26 September in Adelaide and 3 October in other locations to 16 October (9 October in Adelaide). The films were: Evangelion: 3.0 You Can (Not) Redo, 009 Re:Cyborg, A Letter to Momo, Ghost in the Shell: Arise and The Garden of Words.

References
Urban Cinefile - Box Office

See also
List of Australian films - Australian films by year
2013 in film

2013
Australia
2013 in Australian cinema